Steve Stenstrom (born December 23, 1971) is a former professional American football quarterback.

College career
Stenstrom attended Stanford University where he was a member of Sigma Nu Fraternity. Stenstrom was the starting quarterback at Stanford University from 1991 to 1994, and still holds many of Stanford's passing records:

Total yards, career: 9,825
Passing yards gained, career: 10,531
Passing yards gained, season: 3,627 (1993)
Pass attempts, career: 1,320
Pass attempts, season: 455 (1993)
Pass completions, career: 833
Pass completions, season: 300 (1993)
Completion percentage, game: .882 (15/17) (1991)

NFL career
Stenstrom was selected by the Kansas City Chiefs in the 4th round of the 1995 NFL Draft. Stenstrom played in five NFL seasons from 1996 to 1999 for the Chicago Bears and San Francisco 49ers. He started seven games for the Bears during the 1998 season, as well as three games for the 49ers during the 1999 season after Steve Young's career-ending injury. He spent a partial season with the Detroit Lions in 2000 and then signed on with the Denver Broncos in the spring of 2001 where he retired from the NFL shortly thereafter.

After football
Following his football career, Stenstrom returned to Stanford University to lead the Cardinal Life Christian ministry for athletes and along with his wife, Lori, established a program in the San Francisco Bay Area called 2nd Mile. Stenstrom is now the President of Profession Athletes Outreach (PAO), a Christian outreach program for coaches, players, and professional athletes. His son, Blake, is a quarterback for Princeton University. His daughter, Brook, swam for Stanford from 2016-2020. His youngest daughters, Lindsay and Ashley, currently (as of 2022) swim for UCLA.

See also
List of Division I FBS passing yardage leaders

References

1971 births
Living people
American football quarterbacks
Chicago Bears players
Sportspeople from Lake Forest, California
Players of American football from California
San Francisco 49ers players
Sportspeople from Orange County, California
Stanford Cardinal football players